The Paramount at Buckhead is a 478 ft (146 m) tall residential skyscraper in Atlanta, Georgia, and the tallest building in The Alliance Center complex.  It was constructed between 2002 and 2004, and has 40 floors above ground and 5 floors below ground.  It is the 21st tallest building in Atlanta.  The Paramount at Buckhead is the tallest residential structure ever built using tunnelform concrete construction.

References 

Residential skyscrapers in Atlanta
Residential condominiums in the United States